The Institut d'optique Graduate School ("Institute of optics"), nicknamed SupOptique or IOGS, is one of the most prestigious French Grandes Ecoles and the leading French grande école in the field of Optics and its industrial and scientific applications, and a graduate school of the prestigious Paris-Saclay University and ParisTech.

History
Armand de Gramont, a rich industrialist and friend of Marcel Proust, was the man who had the idea to create the Institut d'Optique. In 1916, Gramont and Henri Chrétien (a French astronomer) were working together at the French Technical Aeronautics Section. Chrétien was working at the time on calculations for optical instruments. They both decided to create the project of building an institute dedicated to teaching Optics. That same year, Gramont became part of a committee that examined inventions that could interest the ministry of Defense. That is where he met Charles Fabry, who had previously become famous thanks to his experimental demonstration of the existence of the ozone layer in the atmosphere. On October 21, 1916, Gramont had lunch with four government ministers. As a result, a new committee was formed, in charge of establishing the project. During the month of November 1917, the first board meeting was held.

The École supérieure d'optique (ESO) was opened in 1920, as part of the Institut d'optique théorique et appliquée, aiming to train engineers and cadres for the French optics industry. It is consequently the oldest institution of higher education and research in optics in the world and the most important in terms of annual number of graduates.

The Institut d'optique Graduate School provides an education of high scientific level, especially for former students from the French Classe préparatoire aux grandes écoles. It trains engineers to be, in industry and research, the actors of the development of optics in many areas such as telecommunications, biology, energy, materials, nanotechnologies, and aerospace engineering. It trains also researchers and teachers in the fields of optics and physics. Through the Institut d'optique théorique et appliquée, it participates at the world level to the promotion of knowledge and to the development of new techniques in optics.

Since September 2006, the set constituted by the École supérieure d'optique and the Institut d'optique théorique et appliquée has been designated by the names Institut d'optique Graduate School or Institut d'optique.

Academics

A number of noted French optical scientists have been associated with SupOptique, including Henri Chrétien, Charles Fabry, André Maréchal, and Alain Aspect.

As of 2006 the school had 50 permanent faculty members (teachers, teacher-researchers and researchers), 241 students in the ESO engineering diploma programme, 15 students in the national research master programme (some of them matriculated in the Paris XI University or another institution) and 40 doctoral students (matriculated in the Paris XI).

Admission and engineer's degree

Like most grandes écoles in France, students have to follow a two or three-year intensive preparation in a classe préparatoire aux grandes écoles (CPGE) before entering the school after having sat a competitive entrance exam. If selected, students can then follow the three-year course. For those undergraduate students, the engineer's degree of the school ('ESO engineering diploma') is a first degree. About 10 graduate students enter also the first or second year of the engineer's degree programme after sitting an entrance exam.

The course lasts for three years. The student will thus follow part of the studies at the school and will work at the company the rest of the time.

It is possible to follow courses abroad in universities that have partnerships with the school (such as Imperial College or Cambridge University for instance) for the entire year. Students can also choose to do their second and third years a special branch of the school located in Saint-Étienne or since 2012 at Bordeaux.

The first year consists of fundamental physics and engineering sciences (820 hours). At the end of year one, students must do a one-month internship. Year two is centered around optical components (720 hours) and ends with a two-month internship. And finally, during year three, students must choose amongst a variety of specialities and learn how to integrate optical technologies to systems.

Curriculum

Year one

Mathematics (signal processing, probability and noise), geometric optics, physical optics, polarization, electronics (analogue and digital), computer sciences (numerical analysis and C programming), quantum mechanics, atomic physics, semiconductors, electromagnetism, microprocessors, engineering sciences (automatics), practicals (optics and electronics), communication, English, second language (Spanish, German, Swedish, Chinese, Japanese)

Year two

Lasers, Fourier optics, aberrations & diffraction, radiometry, detection systems, optical design, computer sciences (C language), laser diodes, electro- and acousto-optics, waveguided optics, non-linear optics, holography, statistical optics, light-matter interaction, statistical physics, biophotonics, electronics (commutation and high frequencies, practicals (optics and electronics), project work, English, second language, innovation in science and engineering, company economy

Year three

Three specialities to choose from:

Laser technology, signal processing applied to imaging, non-linear electromagnetism, optronics, telecommunications, computer sciences (C++ language)

Three specialities to choose from:

Imaging, opto-electronic components, micro-optics, turbulence imaging, near field microscopy, nanophotonics, plasma, computer sciences (optical design software), micro-fabrication, radar, economy courses at the HEC school in Paris

Three specialities to choose from:

Opto-mechanical surfaces, bio-physics, bio-photonics, visualization, quantum optics, pattern recognition, optical sensors, photometric engineering, HEC courses

Compulsory subjects:

English, project management, company and contract law, patents, project work (20–30 days)

Post-graduate studies
Graduates from a university (with a French diploma or degree "DUT", "BTS", "licence", "master" or a foreign degree) can be admitted in the first or second year of the ESO engineering diploma programme. Graduates from the École polytechnique and from the École normale supérieure Paris-Saclay can be admitted in the fifth years of this programme.

The Institut d'optique Graduate School organizes also a national research master programme in two years for graduate students with a licence or an equivalent foreign degree. Students in the ESO engineering diploma programme have also access to this programme. A doctorate in optics can be prepared in the internationally recognized research laboratory of Institut d'optique, the Laboratoire Charles Fabry; the doctor's degree is awarded by the Université Paris-Sud or the École polytechnique.

Research

Research teams and activities

Most research groups are part of the Charles Fabry Laboratory since 1998, which is associated to the CNRS and the Université Paris-Sud. Patrick Georges is the director of the laboratory. In 2022, it is composed of 64 permanent staff and 67 PhD students.

In 2022, the different research groups of the laboratory are:
"Quantum Gases" group (head: Alain Aspect, Christoph Westbrook, Denis Boiron, Isabelle Bouchoule) : study of ultra-cold atomic gases (He*, Rb, K, Sr) (atom optics, Bose-Hubbard systems in 2D and 3D with individual atom detection, condensates mixtures with tunable interactions, 3D Anderson localization, 1D Bose gases on atom chip). The first metastable helium (He*) Bose-Einstein condensate was produced in 2001.
"Quantum optics" group (head: Philippe Grangier, Antoine Browaeys, Rosa Tualle-Brouri) : foundations of quantum mechanics, quantum communications and cryptography, non-classical states generation and manipulation, Rydberg atoms tweezers arrays for quantum simulation and computing (Rb), collective effects in light-atoms interactions (Rb, Dy). The group pioneered the trapping and manipulation of single neutral Rydberg atoms in optical tweezers, and the assembling of configurable arrays of interacting Rydberg atoms.
"Imaging and Information" group (head: Caroline Kulcsár & François Goudail) : digital processing, adaptative optics, polarimetric imaging, co-design of imaging systems
"Nanophotonics & Electromagnetism" group (head: Henri Benisty & Philippe Lalanne) : nano-optics devices and metasurfaces, plasmonics and quantum nanophotonics, thermoplasmonics
Laser group (head: Patrick Georges, Frédéric Druon) : ultrashort sources, semiconductor lasers, LED pumping, laser systems
Biophotonics group (head: Michael Canva, Nathalie Westbrook) : in vivo functional imagery, OCT imagery, kinetics of individual biomolecules, biochips, optical tweezers
XUV optics group and fabrication lab (head: Franck Delmotte) : design and fabrication of high-precision XUV optics for EUV telescopes, soft X-ray microscopy, plasma diagnosis, attosecond physics... The mirrors used for the STEREO mission (NASA project) and for the Solar Orbiter's EUI instrument were made at Institut d'Optique.
Non-linear photonics group (head: Philippe Delaye)

In 2005, the total budget for the research department is 7.8 million euros. The school also has a special body called IOTech that has the function of working on industrial development.

International partnerships

About 60% of the students have an international experience as they come out of the school, after having gone abroad for a whole year of study or through an internship. It is possible to study abroad at a foreign university or school as part of the degree, through which students usually receive a double diploma.

International partnerships: 
 UK: University of Cambridge, Cambridge (Part III of Mathematics Tripos at Department of Applied Mathematics and Theoretical Physics) 
 UK: Imperial College, London (Master of Science in optics and photonics, nanophotonic, quantum fields and fundamental forces) 
 Canada: Université Laval (Maîtrise en physique)
 USA: University of Arizona, Tucson (Master of Science in optical sciences)
 USA: University of Central Florida, Orlando (Master of Science in physics)
 Sweden: Royal Institute of Technology (double degree)

The "Optics in Science and Technology" Erasmus Mundus programme takes part in 23 projects that are recognized by the European Commission. The members of this programme are:
 France: Institut d'Optique Graduate School
 France: Université de Paris-Sud
 Netherlands: Technische Universiteit Delft, Delft (Master of Science in applied physics)
 Germany: Friedrich Schiller University of Jena, Jena (Diplom-Physiker)
 Poland: Warsaw University of Technology, Warsaw 
 UK: Imperial College, London (Master of Science in optics and photonics).

References

External links
 L'Institut d'Optique, with link to the École supérieure d'optique
 The MSc Optics in Science and Technology of the Erasmus Mundus programme

optique
Educational institutions established in 1917
Paris-Saclay
Paris-Saclay University
1917 establishments in France